Iain David Thomas Vallance, Baron Vallance of Tummel,  (born 20 May 1943) is a British businessman and a retired  Liberal Democrat member of the House of Lords.

Early life and education
Vallance was educated at the Edinburgh Academy, Dulwich College, London and The Glasgow Academy. In 1965 he graduated from Brasenose College, Oxford with a Bachelor of Arts in English language and literature, and in 1972 from the London Business School with a Master of Science in business administration.

Career

Post Office
Vallance worked in the Post Office from 1966 to 1981, as director of central finance from 1976 to 1978, as director of telecommunications finance from 1978 to 1979 and as director of materials department from 1979 to 1981.

BT
In 1981 he moved to the soon to be privatised British Telecommunications, for which he worked until 2002. After a period in finance, Vallance became Chief of Operations in 1985, and Chief Executive from 1986 to 1995, as chairman from 1987 until, with many investors calling for his resignation, he resigned as chairman in 2001, and finally served as president emeritus from 2001 to 2002. In 1999 he made a speech to the Telecoms Managers Association, which led to him being called the lollipop man:

The Greenbury Committee
In 1995 Vallance was a member of the Greenbury committee which produced a report, known as the Greenbury Report, into executive remuneration. The report was formally commissioned at the behest of the CBI, although in his memoirs Michael Heseltine claims that he personally instigated the formation of the committee.

Vallance's appointment to the committee came despite previous high-profile controversy over his own pay at BT.

Siemens
Since 2003 he has been member of the supervisory board of Siemens.

Honours
He was made a Knight Bachelor in 1994 and was created a life peer with the title Baron Vallance of Tummel, of Tummel in Perth and Kinross on 22 June 2004.

Vallance also received an Honorary Doctorate from Heriot-Watt University in 1995

Family
Vallance married Elizabeth Mary McGonnigill in 1967; they have one daughter and a son. Lady Vallance died in 2020.

References

1943 births
Alumni of London Business School
Alumni of Brasenose College, Oxford
Knights Bachelor
Vallance of Trummel 
Living people
People educated at Edinburgh Academy
People educated at Dulwich College
People educated at the Glasgow Academy
British Telecom people
N M Rothschild & Sons people
Life peers created by Elizabeth II